Sauveterre is the name or part of the name of several communes in France:

 Sauveterre, Gard, in the Gard département
 Sauveterre, Gers, in the Gers département
 Sauveterre, Hautes-Pyrénées, in the Hautes-Pyrénées département
 Sauveterre, Tarn, in the Tarn département
 Sauveterre, Tarn-et-Garonne, in the Tarn-et-Garonne département
 Sauveterre-de-Béarn, in the Pyrénées-Atlantiques département
 Sauveterre-de-Comminges, in the Haute-Garonne département
 Sauveterre-de-Guyenne, in the Gironde département
 Sauveterre-de-Rouergue, in the Aveyron département
 Sauveterre-la-Lémance, in the Lot-et-Garonne département
 Sauveterre-Saint-Denis, in the Lot-et-Garonne département
 Causse de Sauveterre, a plateau in Lozère, France